Statistical discrimination may refer to:

Statistical discrimination (economics)
Linear discriminant analysis (statistics)